Robert Stine may refer to:
 R. L. Stine (born 1943), American writer and producer
Robert Stine, co-founder of the Viking Brotherhood